Paula Jean Swearengin (born June 13, 1974) is an American activist and politician who was the Democratic nominee in the 2020 U.S. Senate election in West Virginia, and a candidate in the Democratic primary for the state's other Senate seat in 2018. Her 2018 campaign was one of four campaigns featured in the 2019 documentary Knock Down the House.

Swearengin lost the 2020 election to Republican incumbent Shelley Moore Capito by more than 40 percentage points, and the 2018 primary to incumbent Joe Manchin. She left the Democratic Party in 2021 and joined the Movement for a People’s Party. She left the organization in 2022.

Early life 
Swearengin was born in Mullens, West Virginia to a family of coal miners historically affiliated with the United Mine Workers of America (UMWA). One of her grandfathers served in the Korean War, and her father in the Vietnam War. She lost her grandfather and several uncles to black lung disease contracted in the coal mines. Her father died of cancer at age 52.

Career 
Swearengin was professionally employed as an office manager. She has advocated for economic diversity, clean air and clean water in her community, and all of West Virginia, since 2001. She is a former board member and representative of the Keepers of the Mountain Foundation, a West Virginia organization that opposed mountaintop removal mining. She has also spoken on behalf of the Ohio Valley Environmental Coalition and the Sierra Club at public fora and events, including EPA hearings on the Clean Power Plan. She supported Bernie Sanders's 2016 presidential campaign. On February 20, 2022, Swearengin left the People's Party.

2018 election

In May 2017, Swearengin announced her candidacy against Joe Manchin in the U.S. Senate election in West Virginia. She was one of the first candidates supported by Brand New Congress. Swearengin refused all PAC donations in the election and received no contributions over $200.

Swearengin's campaign was highlighted in the 2019 documentary Knock Down the House alongside the primary campaigns of Alexandria Ocasio-Cortez, Amy Vilela, and Cori Bush, three other Democrats who ran for Congress in the 2018 midterm elections, with Ocasio-Cortez winning her election. The film premiered at the 2019 Sundance Film Festival. and was released on Netflix on May 1, 2019.

Positions
Swearengin supports a Medicare for All healthcare plan. She favors legalization of both medical and recreational cannabis. She also supports raising the minimum wage to $15 and free public college tuition. She has spoken out against the influence of pharmaceutical companies in addressing the opioid epidemic and argues that long-term treatment centers and a harm reduction model both have roles to play in addressing the epidemic.

2020 election

In June 2019, Swearengin announced her campaign for Senate against Republican incumbent Shelley Moore Capito. She had two opponents in the June 9 Democratic primary, Richie Robb and Richard Ojeda. Swearengin won with 38% of the vote to Ojeda's 33% and Robb's 29%. In the November 3 general election she faced Capito, who has been a Senator since 2015, and unaffiliated candidate Franklin Riley, losing to the former.

Swearengin joined her three other Knock Down the House co-stars in endorsing Vermont Senator Bernie Sanders for the Democratic nomination for president in 2020. Sanders endorsed Swearengin's campaign for Senate on July 8, 2020. In the November general election, Capito defeated Swearengin. Swearengin left the Democratic party less than one year later, writing in July 2021 of the West Virginia Democratic Party and the DNC that "I can't support racism or them ignoring Appalachian children dying & suffering."

Electoral history

Personal life 
Swearengin is a single mother. She has four children and one grandson. She lives in Coal City, West Virginia.

References

External links 

 

1974 births
Living people
21st-century American politicians
21st-century American women politicians
Activists from North Carolina
Activists from West Virginia
American environmentalists
American women environmentalists
Candidates in the 2018 United States Senate elections
Candidates in the 2020 United States Senate elections
People from Raleigh County, West Virginia
People from Mullens, West Virginia
People from Yadkin County, North Carolina
West Virginia politicians
West Virginia Democrats